The 1992 Tour du Haut Var was the 24th edition of the Tour du Haut Var cycle race and was held on 22 February 1992. The race started in Grimaud and finished in Draguignan. The race was won by Gérard Rué.

General classification

References

1992
1992 in road cycling
1992 in French sport